The 1982 SEC women's basketball tournament took place February 25 through 28 in Lexington, Kentucky.

Kentucky won the tournament by beating Tennessee in the championship game.

Tournament

Asterisk denotes game ended in overtime.

All-Tournament team 
Janet Harris, Georgia
Patty Jo Hedges, Kentucky
Valerie Still, Kentucky (MVP)
Joyce Walker, LSU
Tanya Haave, Tennessee
Mary Ostrowski, Tennessee

References

SEC women's basketball tournament
1982 in sports in Kentucky
College sports tournaments in Kentucky